Spodnje Mladetiče is a settlement west of Krmelj in the Municipality of Sevnica in central Slovenia. The area is part of the historical region of Styria and is now included in the Lower Sava Statistical Region.

References

External links
Spodnje Mladetiče at Geopedia

Populated places in the Municipality of Sevnica